Stroud is a village and civil parish in the East Hampshire district of Hampshire, England.

References

Villages in Hampshire